Hemipenthes is a large genus of flies belonging to the family Bombyliidae (bee-flies). There are many described species, distributed throughout the Holarctic realm. These are small to large robust flies with a body length of 5–14 mm. They can be distinguished from similar genera (Villa) by their  wing venation. A number of species formerly in this genus were moved to a separate genus, ins in 2020.

Larvae are hyperparasites on parasitic Hymenoptera.

Extant species
H. alba Ávalos-Hernández, 2009 - Nearctic: Mexico
H. bigradata (Loew, 1869) - Nearctic: USA (California, New Mexico). Neotropical: Cuba, Bahamas, Jamaica, Puerto Rico
H. blanchardiana (Jaennicke, 1867) - Nearctic: Mexico (Distrito Federal, Guanajuato, Guerrero, México, Puebla, Sonora), USA (Arizona, California, Texas)
H. castanipes Bigot, 1892 - Nearctic
H. catulina (Coquillett, 1894) - Nearctic: USA (California, Colorado, Idaho, Illinois, Indiana, Iowa, Michigan, Minnesota, Montana, New Jersey, New Mexico, New York, Ohio, Pennsylvania, Utah, Washington, Wisconsin, Wyoming)
H. chimaera (Osten Sacken, 1887) - Nearctic: Mexico (Guerrero, Sonora), USA (Arizona)
H. comanche (Painter in Painter & Painter, 1962) - Nearctic: USA (Arizona, California, Colorado, Nevada, New Mexico, Utah)
H. differens (Hall, 1976) - Neotropical: Chile
H. discolor (Hall, 1976) - Neotropical: Chile
H. ditaenia (Wiedemann, 1828) - Neotropical: Argentina, Chile, Peru, Uruguay
H. divisa (Walker) - Neotropical: South America
H. edwardsii (Coquillett, 1894) - Nearctic: Canada (British Columbia), USA (California)
H. edwarsi (Oldroyd, 1938) - Neotropical: Chile
H. epilais (Wiedemann, 1828) - Neotropical: Brazil
H. ethiops (Greathead, 1967) - Afrotropical: Ethiopia
H. eversmanni Zaitzev and Madra Mandicencio, 1966 - Palaearctic: Kazakhstan, Moldova, Russia, Ukraine
H. exoprosopoides Paramonov, 1928 - Palaearctic: Armenia, Azerbaijan, China (Sichuan), Iran, Kyrgyz Republic, Tajikistan, Turkmenistan, Uzbekistan.
H. extensa Wulp, 1888 - Neotropical: Argentina
H. galapagensis (Painter & Painter, 1974) - Neotropical: Argentina
H. galathea (Osten Sacken, 1886) - Neotropical: Costa Rica
H. gaudanica Paramonov, 1927 - Palaearctic: China (Xinjiang), Iran, Kyrgyz Republic, Mongolia, Tajikistan, Turkmenistan, Uzbekistan
H. gayi (Macquart, 1840) - Neotropical: Chile
H. gussakovskyi Zaitzev, 1966 - Palaearctic: Tajikistan, Turkmenistan
H. hamifera (Loew, 1854) - Palaearctic: Armenia, Azerbaijan, Bulgaria, China (Jiangsu, Nei Monggol, Xinjiang), France, Greece, Gruzia, Iran, Italy (incl. Sicily), Kazakhstan, Kyrgyz Republic, Mongolia, Russia (ES, WS), Spain, Tajikistan, Turkey, Turkmenistan, Uzbekistan, Yugoslavia
H. incisiva (Walker, 1852) - Nearctic: Mexico (Guerrero)
H. inops (Coquillett, 1887) - Nearctic: USA (Arizona, California, Colorado, Oregon, Utah, Washington)
H. jaennickeana (Osten Sacken, 1886) - Nearctic: Mexico (Morelos, Sonora), USA (Arizona, California, Colorado, Idaho, Montana, Nevada, New Mexico, Oregon, Texas, Utah)
H. jezoensis (Matsumura, 1916) - Oriental: Taiwan. Palaearctic: Japan
H. lepidota (Osten Sacken, 1887) - Nearctic: Canada (Alberta), Mexico (Baja California Norte, Baja California Sur, Chihuahua, Guerrero, Puebla, San Luis Potosí, Sonora, Tamaulipas), USA (Arizona, California, Colorado, Idaho, Louisiana, Nevada)
H. maura (Linnaeus, 1758) - Palaearctic
H. melaleuca (Wiedemann, 1828) - Neotropical: Argentina, Uruguay
H. melana Bowden, 1965 - Oriental: Nepal
H. mesasiatica Zaitzev, 1962 - Palaearctic: Tajikistan, Turkmenistan, Uzbekistan
H. micromelas (Bigot, 1892) - Neotropical: Argentina
H. mischanensis Paramonov, 1927 - Palaearctic: Armenia
H. montanorum (Austen, 1936) - Oriental: China (Yunnan). Palaearctic: China (Qinghai, Sichuan, Xizang)
H. morio (Linnaeus, 1758) - Oriental, Palaearctic
H. nitidofasciata (Portschinsky, 1892) - Palaearctic: Kyrgyz Republic, Russia, Tajikistan
H. noscibilis (Austen, 1936) - Palaearctic: China (Xizang)
H. nudiuscula (Thomson, 1869) - Neotropical: Panama
H. pamirensis Zaitzev, 1962 - Palaearctic: Mongolia, Tajikistan, Turkmenistan, Uzbekistan
H. panfilovi Zaitzev, 1981 - Palaearctic: Russia
H. pauper (Becker, 1916) - Palaearctic: Algeria, Egypt
H. praecisa (Loew, 1869) - Palaearctic: China (Beijing, Hebei, Nei Monggol), Kyrgyz Republic, Mongolia, Russia, Tajikistan, Turkmenistan, Uzbekistan
H. pullata (Coquillett, 1894) - Nearctic: USA (Arizona, California)
H. referens (Walker, 1852) - Oriental: India, Myanmar, Pakistan
H. robusta Zaitzev, 1966 - Palaearctic: Armenia, Azerbaijan, China, Gruzia, Kazakhstan, Kyrgyz Republic, Tajikistan, Turkmenistan, Uzbekistan
H. ruficollis (Bigot, 1892) - Neotropical: Argentina, Venezuela
H. scylla (Osten Sacken, 1887) - Nearctic: Mexico (Guanajuato, Sonora), USA (Arizona, Texas). Neotropical: Venezuela
H. semifucata (Hall, 1976) - Nearctic: USA (Arizona)
H. seminigra Loew, 1869 - Nearctic: Canada (Alberta, Saskatchewan), Mexico (Sonora), USA (Arizona, California, Colorado, Idaho, Montana, Nevada, New Mexico, Oregon, Utah, Washington). Neotropical: Puerto Rico (incl. H. eumenes)
H. sinuosa (Wiedemann, 1821) - Nearctic: USA
H. splendida Zaitzev, 1962 - Palaearctic: Kazakhstan, Kyrgyz Republic, Tajikistan, Turkmenistan
H. subarcuata Loew, 1871 - Palaearctic: Tajikistan, Tunisia
H. subvelutina Loew, 1871 - Palaearctic: Armenia, Azerbaijan, China (Shandong), Gruzia, Iran, Mongolia, Kazakhstan, Kyrgyz Republic, Tajikistan, Turkey, Turkmenistan, Uzbekistan
H. tarapacensis (Hall, 1976) - Neotropical: Chile
H. tenuirostris (Macquart, 1850) - Neotropical: Chile, Peru
H. translucens Ávalos-Hernández, 2009 - Nearctic: Mexico
H. tushetica Zaitzev, 1966 - Palaearctic: Armenia, Azerbaijan, China (Nei Monggol, Qinghai, Xinjiang), Gruzia, Iran
H. velutina (Meigen, 1820) - Oriental (Pakistan), Palaearctic
H. villeneuvi François, 1970 - Palaearctic: France, Greece, Italy
H. vockerothi François, 1969 - Palaearctic: Spain
H. webberi (Johnson, 1919) - Nearctic: Canada (Ontario, Quebec), USA (Connecticut, Kentucky, Massachusetts, Vermont, Wyoming)
H. wilcoxi (Painter, 1933) - Nearctic: USA (California, Washington)
H. yaqui (Painter in Painter & Painter, 1962) - Nearctic: Mexico (Sonora), USA (Arizona)

Extinct species
H. gabbroensis (Handlirsch, 1907) - (Miocene) Italy
H. provincialis (Handlirsch, 1907) - (Oligocene) France
H. tertiaria (Handlirsch, 1907) - (Oligocene) Germany

References

Bombyliidae
Bombyliidae genera
Asilomorph flies of Europe
Diptera of Africa
Diptera of Asia
Diptera of North America
Hyperparasites